The European Common Aviation Area (ECAA) is a single market in aviation services.

ECAA agreements were signed on 5 May 2006 in Salzburg, Austria between the EU and some external countries. It built upon the EU's acquis communautaire and the European Economic Area. The ECAA liberalises the air transport industry by allowing any company from any ECAA member state to fly between any ECAA member states airports, thereby allowing a "foreign" airline to provide domestic flights.

Membership

Founding members 
On 9 June 2006, the ECAA agreement was signed by almost all of the 27 EU members, the European Union itself, Albania, Bosnia and Herzegovina, Croatia, Iceland, Montenegro, North Macedonia, Norway, Serbia as well as Kosovo (UNMIK as Kosovo representative under Security Council resolution 1244). The last two EU member states to sign it were Slovakia and Latvia respectively on 13 June 2006 and 22 June 2006.

Enlargements 
Further agreements to join the Common Aviation Area have been offered to the EU's Eastern Partnership members. Agreements currently in force, include:
Georgia signed a CAA on 2 December 2010.
Moldova signed on 26 June 2012. 
Ukraine and the EU signed a Common Aviation Area agreement on 12 October 2021, as part of the 23rd Ukraine-EU summit in Kyiv. The Prime Minister of Ukraine Denys Shmyhal, the Ambassador of Slovenia (then the EU Presidency) to Ukraine Tomaž Mentzin and the Head of the EU Foreign Service Josep Borrell signed the agreement. 
Armenia started negotiations to join after a new Armenia-EU partnership agreement was signed in February 2017. Armenia and the EU finalized negotiations on 15 November 2021, with the signing of a Common Aviation Area Agreement between the two sides at a ceremony in Brussels.

Euro-Mediterranean aviation agreements (EMAAs) 
Moreover, a system of association agreements with the ECAA has been enacted for the Mediterranean partnership countries.

In force 
Morocco signed its Euro-Mediterranean Aviation Agreement (EMAA) with the EU on 12 December 2006 with the Kingdom of Morocco. 
Jordan signed its Euro-Mediterranean Aviation Agreement (EMAA) with the EU on 15 December 2010. 
Israel signed its Euro-Mediterranean Aviation Agreement (EMAA) with the EU on 10 June 2013.

Under negotiation 
Tunisia started its negotiations on 27 June 2013. 
Lebanon: on 9 October 2008, the Council of the European Union adopted a decision authorising the European Commission to open negotiations.
Algeria: also on 9 December 2008, the Council of the European Union adopted a decision authorising the European Commission to open negotiations, though the negotiations with Algeria have not started yet.

Brexit 
Because the UK has left the European Union (Brexit), the UK is no longer part of the Common Aviation Area. Unless permission or new treaties with the UK are made, aviation to and from the UK may stop. There was a delay in this hard Brexit until the end of 2020, because the Brexit withdrawal agreement states that most EU rules continue to be valid for the UK during 2020. However, EU has approved regulations 2019/494 and 2019/505 in order to secure air traffic between UK and EU plus EEA.
Also, the British government has taken various steps to ensure the continuation of air travel, such as an open skies agreement with the United States. The British airline EasyJet which has many flights outside the UK has set up a subsidiary in Austria (easyJet Europe) whilst keeping its headquarters in Luton, England.

See also 

 Single European Sky

References

External links 
 European Common Aviation Area Agreement

 Single European Sky – European Commission website
 Single European Sky – EUROCONTROL website
 Multilateral Agreement on the establishment of a European Common Aviation Area

Transport and the European Union
Air traffic control in Europe
Aviation safety
Aviation in Europe
Aviation agreements